unINDIAN is a 2015 Australian romantic comedy film directed by Anupam Sharma and starring Brett Lee and Tannishtha Chatterjee. It was entirely shot in Sydney.

Plot 
The story is set in Australia in Sydney where Will Henderson (Brett Lee), tall and blonde with a charming smile, who teaches Australian English to immigrants, falls in love with Meera (Tannishtha Chatterjee), a beautiful divorcee Australian woman of Indian origin and a single mother of a 10-year-old girl, Smitha. Meera is smart and independent and has carved out a successful life for herself and her daughter. Meera 's ex-husband Deepak Khurana (Gulshan Grover) had earlier tried to lure and take away infant Smitha with him to India but was nabbed by the police after a complaint by Meera. While Meera's parents (Akash Khurana) and (Supriya Pathak) want to make a good match for her, she is not ready for any relationship. It takes a while before Meera is willing to take a risk by dating Will, despite family pressure to find 'a nice Indian match'; how the situation between Meera and Will develops through a series of ups and down is the focus of the narrative.
In a dream sequence, Will sees himself dancing with Meera in an actual Bollywood movie (Sajid Nadiadwala's 2014 film Kick).

Smitha confides in Will that she wants to meet her father, to which Will responds by helping her to meet him. 
However, the clever Deepak hatches a plan to leave for India via New Zealand with Smitha. He almost succeeds but is nabbed by the police again after Will reveals to Meera his attempt to help Smitha. Meera lashes out at Will for his folly and tells him that Deepak is gay and a very mean, self-centered man who has no real interest in his daughter's welfare. Police are informed and block Sydney airport and railway station, ultimately stopping Deepak at the port where he was planning to escape by ship with Smitha. After some misunderstanding, Will decides to quit his job and leave Sydney. Smitha asks her mother to stop Will from leaving since he is a good man at heart. Meera agrees and rushes to the airport to stop Will but finds that the flight has already taken off. She returns home dejectedly but is surprised to find Will there with her parents and daughter Smitha waiting for her.

Cast

 Brett Lee as Will Henderson
 Tannishtha Chatterjee as Meera
 Stephen Hunter as Detective Thompson
 Pallavi Sharda as Shanthi in a special appearance
 Gulshan Grover as Deepak Khurana, Meera's ex-husband
 Supriya Pathak as Savita, Meera's mother
 Akash Khurana as Ashok, Meera's dad
 Anupam Sharma as Swami
 Maya Sathiamoorthy as Smitha, Meera's daughter

Soundtrack

The soundtrack for UnIndian is composed by Salim–Sulaiman. The background score is composed by Amanda Brown. The music rights are acquired by Zee Music Company.

Review 
 3.5 stars by Times Of India
 3.5 stars by Arts & Culture
 3 stars by Bollywoodlife.com
 2.5 stars by The Indian Express
 2.5 stars by News18.com
 2 stars by Hindustan Times
 2 stars by Deccan Chronicle

References

External links
 
 
 Films and Casting Temple

2015 films
Films set in Australia
Films shot in Australia
Australian romantic comedy films
2010s English-language films